Portrait of a Fanatic is a 1982 Taiwanese period film directed by Wang Toon, adapted by Wu Nien-jen from Bai Hua's 1980 screenplay, which was first made into a film in mainland China that quickly received a ban there on orders of Deng Xiaoping himself. Part of China's scar literature, Bai Hua's story is set in mainland China and the United States. It follows the turbulent life of a patriotic Chinese painter from the 1930s to the 1970s, as he escapes Japan's bombings during the Second Sino-Japanese War, assassinations by the repressive Nationalist government during the Chinese Civil War, and after the founding of the People's Republic of China, the horrors of the Cultural Revolution when millions of intellectuals and artists were cruelly persecuted on trumped-up charges.

Awards and nominations
1982 Golden Horse Awards
Won—Best Cinematography (Lin Hung-chung)
Nominated—Best Feature Film

External links

Films with screenplays by Wu Nien-jen
Films directed by Wang Toon
Taiwanese war drama films
Films set in China
Films set in the United States
1980s Mandarin-language films
Films set in the 1930s
Films set in the 1940s
Films set in the 1960s
Films set in the 1970s
Central Motion Picture Corporation films